Hositea regina is a moth in the family Crambidae. It was described by Eugene G. Munroe in 1970. It is found in Santa Catarina, Brazil.

References

Moths described in 1970
Midilinae